"I'm on my way (and I won't turn back)" is a traditional Gospel song. It is described a typical "going-to-Canaan" song; and possibly an Underground Railroad song.

The lyrics begin "I'm on my way and I won't turn back, I'm on my way and I won't turn back, I'm on my way and I won't turn back; I'm on my way, great God, I'm on my way. I asked my brother to come with me..."

Recordings
 The Carter Family
 Odetta on Odetta Sings Ballads and Blues 1956
 Soundtrack for Elmer Gantry (1960)
 The Golden Gate Quartet recorded this song under the title "The Story of Job" 
 Barbara Dane, on her album "On My Way", 1962.
 The Proclaimers (1988)
 Adapted, into a new song "On My Way"

References

Gospel songs
Year of song unknown